Birja Bhatt takes a mission to stop all the criminals who are killing Indian rhinoceros than he teams up with other people to complete this mission.

Cast
Rajesh Hamal
Mausami Malla
Biraj Bhatta 
Richa Ghimire 
Rajesh Dhungana
Ramchandra Adhikari
Dipendra Acharya 
Naresh Regmi
Pushkar Bhatta
Gopi Darling
Lakshmi
Madhavi
Sushma Basnet

References 

Nepalese drama films